Lao Airlines FC is a football club based Laos. They play in the Lao League, the top national football league in Laos.

References

External links
 Weltfussballarchiv

Football clubs in Laos